Takarjala is one of the 60 Legislative Assembly constituencies of Tripura state in India. It is in Sipahijala district and is reserved for candidates belonging to the Scheduled Tribes. It is also part of West Tripura Lok Sabha constituency.

Members of Legislative Assembly

 1967: M . D . Barma, Indian National Congress
 1972: Gunapada Jamatia, Communist Party of India (Marxist)
 1977: Sudhanwa Debbarma, Communist Party of India (Marxist)
 1983: Sudhanwa Debbarma, Communist Party of India (Marxist)
 1988: Tarani Debbarma, Communist Party of India (Marxist)
 1993: Kartik Kanya Debbarma, Communist Party of India (Marxist)
 1998: Baijayanti Kalai, Communist Party of India (Marxist)
 2003: Rajeswar Debbarma, Indigenous Nationalist Party of Twipra
 2008: Niranjan Debbarma, Communist Party of India (Marxist)
 2013: Niranjan Debbarma, Communist Party of India (Marxist)

Election results

2018

See also
List of constituencies of the Tripura Legislative Assembly
 West Tripura district
 Takarjala
 Tripura West (Lok Sabha constituency)

References

West Tripura district
Assembly constituencies of Tripura